The Kreutz sungrazers are a family of sungrazing comets, characterized by orbits taking them extremely close to the Sun at perihelion. They are believed to be fragments of one large comet that broke up several centuries ago and are named for German astronomer Heinrich Kreutz, who first demonstrated that they were related.

Several members of the Kreutz family have become great comets, occasionally visible near the Sun in the daytime sky.  The most recent of these was Comet Ikeya–Seki in 1965, which may have been one of the brightest comets in the last millennium. It has been suggested that another cluster of bright Kreutz system comets may begin to arrive in the inner Solar System in the next few years to decades.

More than 4000 of smaller members of the family, some only a few meters across, have been discovered since the launch of the SOHO satellite in 1995. None of these smaller comets have survived its perihelion passage. Larger sungrazers such as the Great Comet of 1843 and C/2011 W3 (Lovejoy) have survived their perihelion passage. Amateur astronomers have been successful at discovering Kreutz comets in the data available in real time via the internet.

Discovery and historical observations 

The first comet whose orbit had been found to take it extremely close to the Sun was the Great Comet of 1680. This comet was found to have passed just 200,000 km (0.0013 AU) above the Sun's surface, equivalent to around a seventh of Sun's diameter, or about half the distance between the Earth and the Moon. It thus became the first known sungrazing comet. Its perihelion distance was just 1.3 solar radii, that is, its perihelion was 1.3 solar radii from the center of the Sun, and just 0.3 solar radii above the surface of the Sun.

Astronomers at the time, including Edmond Halley, speculated that this comet was a return of a bright comet seen close to the Sun in the sky in 1106. 163 years later, the Great Comet of 1843 appeared and also passed extremely close to the Sun. Despite orbital calculations showing that it had a period of several centuries, some astronomers wondered if it was a return of the 1680 comet.  A bright comet seen in 1880 was found to be travelling on an almost identical orbit to that of 1843, as was the subsequent Great Comet of 1882.  Some astronomers suggested that perhaps they were all one comet, whose orbital period was somehow being drastically shortened at each perihelion passage, perhaps by retardation by some dense material surrounding the Sun.

An alternative suggestion was that the comets were all fragments of an earlier Sun-grazing comet. This idea was first proposed in 1880, and its plausibility was amply demonstrated when the Great Comet of 1882 broke up into several fragments after its perihelion passage. In 1888, Heinrich Kreutz published a paper showing that the comets of 1843 (C/1843 D1, the Great March Comet), 1880 (C/1880 C1, the Great Southern Comet), and 1882 (C/1882 R1, Great September Comet) were probably fragments of a giant comet that had broken up several orbits before. The comet of 1680 proved to be unrelated to this family of comets.

After another Kreutz sungrazer was seen in 1887 (C/1887 B1, the Great Southern Comet of 1887), the next one did not appear until 1945. Two further sungrazers appeared in the 1960s, Comet Pereyra in 1963 and Comet Ikeya–Seki, which became extremely bright in 1965, and broke into three pieces after its perihelion.  The appearance of two Kreutz Sungrazers in quick succession inspired further study of the dynamics of the group.

The group generally has an Inclination of roughly 140 degrees, a perihelion distance of around 0.01 AU, and a Longitude of ascending node of 340–10°.

Notable members 
The brightest members of the Kreutz sungrazers have been spectacular, easily visible in the daytime sky.  The three most impressive have been the Great Comet of 1843, the Great Comet of 1882 and X/1106 C1. The progenitor of all Kreutz sungrazers observed to date may be the Great Comet of 371 BC, or comets seen in 214 BC, 423 AD or 467 AD. Another notable Kreutz sungrazer was the Eclipse Comet of 1882 (see further below).

Great Comet of 371 BC 

The Great Comet seen in the winter of 372–371 BC was an extremely bright comet thought to be the progenitor of the entire Kreutz sungrazer family. It was observed by Aristotle and Ephorus during the period in which it was visible to the naked eye. It was reported to have had an extremely long, extremely bright, prominent tail with a reddish colour, as well as a nucleus brighter than any star in the night sky. Ephorus also reported the comet to have split into two fragments: a larger fragment which is now thought to have returned in 1106 AD as another spectacular sungrazer, as well as another, much smaller fragment. It is currently thought to have been the giant comet which progressively shattered under the influence of the sun to form the entire family of Kreutz sungrazers. To account for all Kreutz sungrazers observed up to date, the giant comet must have had a nucleus exceeding 120 km in diameter.

Great Comet of 1106 AD 

The Great Comet of 1106 AD was a gigantic comet noticed by observers from all over the world. On 2 February 1106 AD, a star was reported to have appeared next to the sun, about a degree from it. It seems to have diminished in brightness after this apparition, with a rather faint, unremarkable nucleus after perihelion, but its tail grew enormously and on February 7 Japanese observers said the extremely bright white tail stretched about 100 degrees across the night sky, which was also reported to have been branching into multiple tails. On February 9, it dimmed slightly, but its tail was still exceedingly bright, measuring 60 degrees long and 3 degrees across. The entire naked-eye duration of the giant comet has been recorded to be anywhere from 15 to 70 days in European texts, though. Recent evaluations, as well as observations of the comet splitting into multiple pieces after perihelion, have suggested that this comet was the progenitor of an entire subgroup of Kreutz sungrazers, including the extremely bright sungrazers of 1882, 1843 and 1965. Observations also suggest that the larger fragment of the Great Comet of 371 BC, which was observed splitting into two pieces, later returned as the Great Comet of 1106 AD.

Great Comet of 1843 

The Great Comet of 1843 was first noticed in early February of that year, just over three weeks before its perihelion passage. By February 27 it was easily visible in the daytime sky, and observers described seeing a tail 2–3° long stretching away from the Sun before being lost in the glare of the sky. After its perihelion passage, it reappeared in the morning sky, and developed an extremely long tail.  It extended about 45° across the sky on March 11 and was more than 2° wide; the tail was calculated to be more than 300 million kilometers (2 AU) long.  This held the record for the longest measured cometary tail until 2000, when Comet Hyakutake's tail was found to stretch to some 550 million kilometers in length. The maximum apparent magnitude attained by this comet was −10. (The Earth–Sun distance—1 AU—is only 150 million kilometers.)

The comet was very prominent throughout early March, before fading away to almost below naked eye visibility by the beginning of April.  It was last detected on April 20.  This comet apparently made a substantial impression on the public, inspiring in some a fear that judgement day was imminent.

Eclipse Comet of 1882 
A party of observers gathered in Egypt to watch a solar eclipse in May 1882 were greatly surprised when they observed a bright streak near to the Sun once totality began.  By a remarkable coincidence, the eclipse had coincided with the perihelion passage of a Kreutz comet.  The comet would otherwise have gone unnoticed—its sighting during the eclipse was the only observation of it.  Photographs of the eclipse revealed that the comet had moved noticeably during the 1m50s eclipse, as would be expected for a comet racing past the Sun at almost 500 km/s.  The comet is sometimes referred to as Tewfik, after Tewfik Pasha, the Khedive of Egypt at the time.

Great Comet of 1882 

The Great Comet of 1882 was discovered independently by many observers, as it was already easily visible to the naked eye when it appeared in early September 1882, just a few days before perihelion, at which it reached an apparent magnitude estimated to have been −17, by far the brightest recorded for any comet and exceeding the brightness of the full moon by a factor of 57.  It grew rapidly brighter and was eventually so bright it was visible in the daytime for two days (16–17 September), even through light cloud.

After its perihelion passage, the comet remained bright for several weeks.  During October, its nucleus was seen to fragment into first two and then four pieces.  Some observers also reported seeing diffuse patches of light several degrees away from the nucleus.  The rate of separation of the fragments of the nucleus was such that they will return about a century apart, between 670 and 960 years after the break-up.

Comet Ikeya–Seki 

Comet Ikeya–Seki is the most recent very bright Kreutz sungrazer. It was discovered independently by two Japanese amateur astronomers on September 18, 1965, within 15 minutes of each other, and quickly recognised as a Kreutz sungrazer.  It brightened rapidly over the following four weeks as it approached the Sun, and reached apparent magnitude 2 by October 15.  Its perihelion passage occurred on October 21, and observers across the world easily saw it in the daytime sky.  A few hours before perihelion passage on October 21 it had a visible magnitude from −10 to −11, comparable to the first quarter of the Moon and brighter than any other comet seen since 1882. A day after perihelion its magnitude decreased to just −4.

Japanese astronomers using a coronagraph saw the comet break into three pieces 30 minutes before perihelion.  When the comet reappeared in the morning sky in early November, two of these nuclei were definitely detected with the third suspected.  The comet developed a very prominent tail, about 25° in length, before fading throughout November.  It was last detected in January 1966.

Dynamical history and evolution 

A study by Brian G. Marsden in 1967 was the first attempt to trace back the orbital history of the group to identify the progenitor comet.  All known members of the group up until 1965 had almost identical orbital inclinations at about 144°, as well as very similar values for the longitude of perihelion at 280–282°, with a couple of outlying points probably due to uncertain orbital calculations.  A greater range of values existed for the argument of perihelion and longitude of the ascending node.

Marsden found that the Kreutz sungrazers could be split into two groups, with slightly different orbital elements, implying that the family resulted from fragmentations at more than one perihelion. Tracing back the orbits of Ikeya–Seki and the Great Comet of 1882, Marsden found that at their previous perihelion passage, the difference between their orbital elements was of the same order of magnitude as the difference between the elements of the fragments of Ikeya–Seki after it broke up.  This meant it was realistic to presume that they were two parts of the same comet which had broken up one orbit ago.  By far the best candidate for the progenitor comet was that seen in 1106 (Great Comet of 1106): Ikeya–Seki's derived orbital period gave a previous perihelion almost exactly at the right time, and while the Great Comet of 1882's derived orbit implied a previous perihelion a few decades later, it would only require a small change in the orbital elements to bring it into agreement.

The Sun-grazing comets of 1668, 1689, 1702 and 1945 seem to be closely related to those of 1882 and 1965, although their orbits are not well enough determined to establish whether they broke off from the parent comet in 1106, or the previous perihelion passage before that, some time in the 3–5th centuries AD. This subgroup of comets is known as Subgroup II. Comet White–Ortiz–Bolelli, which was seen in 1970, is more closely related to this group than Subgroup I, but appears to have broken off during the previous orbit to the other fragments.

The Sun-grazing comets observed in 1843 (Great Comet of 1843) and 1963 (Comet Pereyra) seem to be closely related and belong to the subgroup I, although when their orbits are traced back to one previous perihelion, the differences between the orbital elements are still rather large, probably implying that they broke apart from each other one revolution before that. They may not be related to the comet of 1106, but rather a comet that returned about 50 years before that. Subgroup I also includes comets seen in 1695, 1880 (Great Southern Comet of 1880) and in 1887 (Great Southern Comet of 1887), as well as the vast majority of comets detected by the SOHO mission (see below).

The distinction between the two sub-groups is thought to imply that they result from two separate parent comets, which themselves were once part of a 'grandparent' comet which fragmented several orbits previously.  One possible candidate for the grandparent is a comet observed by Aristotle and Ephorus in 371 BC.  Ephorus claimed to have seen this comet break into two. However modern astronomers are skeptical of the claims of Ephorus, because they were not confirmed by other sources. Instead comets that arrived between 3rd and 5th centuries AD (comets of 214, 426 and 467) are considered as possible progenitors of the Kreutz family. The original comet must certainly have been very large indeed, perhaps as large as 100 km across (for comparison, the nucleus of Comet Hale–Bopp was about 40 km across).

Although its orbit is rather different from those of the main two groups, it is possible that the comet of 1680 is also related to the Kreutz sungrazers via a fragmentation many orbits ago.

The Kreutz sungrazers are probably not a unique phenomenon.  Studies have shown that for comets with high orbital inclinations and perihelion distances of less than about 2 AU, the cumulative effect of gravitational perturbations tends to result in sungrazing orbits. One study has estimated that Comet Hale–Bopp has about a 15% chance of eventually becoming a Sun-grazing comet.

Recent observations 
Until recently, it would have been possible for even a very bright member of the Kreutz sungrazers to pass through the inner Solar System unnoticed, if its perihelion had occurred between about May and August.  At this time of year, as seen from Earth, the comet would approach and recede almost directly behind the Sun, and could only become visible extremely close to the Sun if it became very bright.  Only a remarkable coincidence between the perihelion passage of the Eclipse Comet of 1882 and a total solar eclipse allowed its discovery.

However, during the 1980s, two Sun-observing satellites serendipitously discovered several new members of the Kreutz family, and since the launch of the SOHO Sun-observing satellite in 1995, it has been possible to observe comets very close to the Sun at any time of year. The satellite provides a constant view of the immediate solar vicinity, and SOHO has now discovered hundreds of new Sun-grazing comets, some just a few metres across. About 83% of the sungrazers found by SOHO are members of the Kreutz group, with the other being referred to as 'non-Kreutz' or 'sporadic' sungrazers (Meyer, Marsden, and Kracht1&2 families). On average, a new member of the Kreutz family is discovered every three days. Apart from Comet Lovejoy, none of the sungrazers seen by SOHO has survived its perihelion passage; some may have plunged into the Sun itself, but most are likely to have simply evaporated away completely.

More than 75% of the SOHO sungrazers have been discovered by amateur astronomers analysing SOHO's observations via the Internet.  Some amateurs have managed remarkable numbers of discoveries, with Rainer Kracht of Germany having chalked up 211,  Michael Oates of the United Kingdom making 144, and Zhou Bo of China spotting 97. As of December 2011, over 2,000 Kreutz sungrazers have been identified using SOHO data.

SOHO observations have shown that Sungrazers frequently arrive in pairs separated by a few hours. These pairs are too frequent to occur by chance, and cannot be due to break-ups on the previous orbit, because the fragments would have separated by a much greater distance. Instead, it is thought that the pairs result from fragmentations far away from the perihelion.  Many comets have been observed to fragment far from perihelion, and it seems that in the case of the Kreutz sungrazers, an initial fragmentation near perihelion can be followed by an ongoing 'cascade' of break-ups throughout the rest of the orbit.

The number of Subgroup I Kreutz comets discovered is about four times the number of Subgroup II members.  This suggests that the 'grandparent' comet split into parent comets of unequal size.

Future 
Dynamically, the Kreutz sungrazers might continue to be recognised as a distinct family for many thousands of years yet.  Eventually, their orbits will be dispersed by gravitational perturbations, although depending on the rate of fragmentation of the constituent parts, the group might be completely destroyed before it is gravitationally dispersed.  The continuing discovery of large numbers of the smaller members of the family by SOHO will undoubtedly lead to a greater understanding of how comets break up to form families.

It is not possible to estimate the chances of another very bright Kreutz comet arriving in the near future, but given that at least 10 have reached naked-eye visibility over the last 200 years, another great comet from the Kreutz family seems almost certain to arrive at some point. Comet White–Ortiz–Bolelli in 1970 reached an apparent magnitude of 1. In December 2011, Kreutz sungrazer C/2011 W3 (Lovejoy) survived its perihelion passage and had an apparent magnitude of −3.

See also
 List of Kreutz Sungrazers
 Lists of comets

References

Further reading 
 Marsden B. G. (1989), The Sungrazing Comets Revisited, Asteroids, comets, meteors III, Proceedings of meeting (AMC 89), Uppsala: Universitet, 1990, eds C. I. Lagerkvist, H. Rickman, B. A. Lindblad., p. 393

External links 

Sungrazer project website 
SEDS Kreutz group page
Cometography sungrazers page 
NASA press release about two Sungrazers seen by SOHO
Complete list of SOHO comets
Real time SOHO data

 

it:Cometa radente#Le comete radenti di Kreutz